Francis Dvornik (14 August 1893, Chomýž – 4 November 1975, Chomýž), in Czech František Dvorník, was a Catholic priest and academic. He is considered one of the leading twentieth-century experts on Slavic and Byzantine history, and on relations between the churches of Rome and Constantinople.

Career
Dvornik taught at Charles University in Prague, the Collège de France, and Harvard University.

He contributed to research that helped rehabilitate, from a Catholic standpoint, the Byzantine patriarch and writer, Photius. He was re-established as significant to the life of the church.

In 1956 Harvard University Press published a festschrift, a collection of Essays Dedicated to F. Dvornik on the Occasion of his 60th Birthday (Harvard Slavic studies no. 2). Upon his retirement, he was Professor Emeritus of Byzantine history at Dumbarton Oaks, Harvard's Center for Byzantine Studies in Washington.

Bibliography

Books
 Les Slaves, Byzance et Rome au IXe siècle. Travaux publiés par l'Institut d'études slaves no. 4. Paris: Champion, 1926. Reprinted 1970.
 La Vie de saint Grégoire le Décapolite et les Slaves macédoniens au IXe siècle. Travaux publiés par l'Institut d'études slaves no. 5. Paris: Champion, 1926.
 Zivot Svatého Václava k tisícímu výrocí jeho mucednické smrti. Prague, 1929.
In French as Saint Venceslas, Duc de Bohême, martyr. Prague: [Comité du Millénaire de St. Venceslas], 1929.
In English as The Life of Saint Wenceslas. Prague: [State printing office], 1929.
 Les Légendes de Constantin et de Méthode: vues de Byzance. Recueil pour l'étude des relations byzantino-slaves, Supplemental. Prague: Commissionnaire "Orbis", 1933. Second edition Hattiesburg: Academic International, 1969.
 The Photian Schism: History and Legend. Cambridge University Press, 1948. Reprinted 1970.
In French as Le Schisme de Photius: histoire et légende. Unam sanctam 19. Paris: Éditions du Cerf, 1950. With a preface by Yves Congar.
 The Idea of Apostolicity in Byzantium and the Legend of the Apostle Andrew. Dumbarton Oaks Studies 4. Cambridge, Mass.: Harvard University Press, 1958.
 The Making of Central and Eastern Europe. London: Polish Research Centre, 1949. Second edition Gulf Breeze, Fla.: Academic International Press, 1974.
In Czech: Zrod střední a východní Evropy: mezi Byzancí a Římem, translated by Petr Slunéčko. Edice Obzor no. 21. Prague: Prostor, 1999. Second edition 2008.
 The Slavs: Their Early History and Civilization. Boston: American Academy of Arts and Sciences, 1956. Reprinted 1959.
In Italian: Gli Slavi: storia e civiltà dalle origini al secolo XIII. Collana di studi sull'Europa orientale 13. Padua: Liviana, 1974.
 The Ecumenical Councils. Twentieth Century Encyclopedia of Catholicism 82. New York: Hawthorn Books, 1961.
In the United Kingdom as The General Councils of the Church. Faith and Fact Books 83. London: Burns & Oates, 1961.
 The Slavs in European History and Civilization. New Brunswick, N.J.: Rutgers University Press, 1962.
In Italian, Gli Slavi nella storia e nella civiltà europea, 2 vols., Bari, edizioni Dedalo, 1968. Russian edition, Moscow, 2001.
 Byzance et la primauté romaine. Unam Sanctam 49. Paris: Éditions du Cerf, 1964.
In English: Byzantium and the Roman Primacy. New York: Fordham University Press, 1966. Corrected edition 1979.
 Early Christian and Byzantine Political Philosophy. Dumbarton Oaks Studies 9.  Washington: Dumbarton Oaks Center for Byzantine Studies, 1966. 2 vols.
 Svatý Vojtěch: druhý pražský biskup. Sůl země no. 1. Řím: Křesťanská akademie, 1967.
 Svatý Václav: dědic České země. Sůl země no. 3. Řím: Křesťanská akademie, 1968.
 Les Slaves: histoire et civilisation : de l'Antiquité aux débuts de l'époque contemporaine. translated by Danielle Pavlevski with the collaboration of Maroussia Chpolyansky. Paris: Seuil, 1970. French combination of  The Slavs (Boston, 1956) and The Slavs in European History and Civilisation (New Brunswick, 1962).
 Byzantine Missions among the Slavs. Rutgers Byzantine Series. New Brunswick, N.J.: Rutgers University Press, 1970.
 Photian and Byzantine Ecclesiastical Studies. Collected Studies 32. Variorum collected studies series. London: Variorum Reprints, 1974.
 Origins of Intelligence Services: The Ancient Near East, Persia, Greece, Rome, Byzantium, the Arab Muslim Empires, the Mongol Empire, China, Muscovy. New Brunswick, N.J.: Rutgers University Press, [1974].

Lectures and articles
 "Le premier schisme de Photios" in Actes du IVe Congrés international des études Byzantines. Bulletin de l'institut archéologique bulgare, IX, 1935.
 "L'oecuménicité du huitième concile (869-870) dans la tradition occidentale du moyen âge". Bulletins de la classe des lettres et des Sciences Morales et Politiques, 5th ser., vol. 24 (1938), pp. 445–487.
 "The First Wave of the 'Drang nach Osten'". Cambridge Historical Journal 7:3 (1943), pp. 129–145.
 "National Churches and the Church Universal". Eastern Churches Quarterly 5 (1945).
 "The Study of Church History and Christian Reunion". Eastern Churches Quarterly 6 (1945).
 "The Diffusion of Greek Culture. 6, Byzantium and the North". Geographical Magazine 19 (1946), pp. 295–304.
 "The Kiev State and Its Relations with Western Europe". Transactions of the Royal Historical Society (1947), pp. 27–46. Reprinted in Essays in Medieval History, selected from the Transactions of the Royal Historical Society on the occasion of its centenary, edited by R. W. Southern. London: Macmillan, 1968.
 "The Diffusion of Greek Culture. 9, Byzantine iInfluences in Russia". Geographical Magazine 20 (1947), pp. 29–40.
 "The Photian Schism in Western and Eastern Tradition". The Kornes Lecture, given at King's College, University of London May 8, 1947. Printed in The Review of Politics 10:3 (1948), pp. 310–331.
 "Byzance, les Slaves et les Francs". Russie et Chrétienté 3-4 (1949).
 "Photius et la réorganisation de l'académie patriarchale". Mélanges Paul Peeters, vol. 2 (Analecta Bollandiana 68). Brussels: Société des Bollandistes, 1950, pp. 108–125.
 "Pope Gelasius and Emperor Anastasius I". Byzantinische Zeitschrift 44 (1951), pp. 111–116.
 "Les Bénédictins et la christianisation de la Russie", in 1054-1954: L’Église et les églises. Neuf siècles de douloureuse séparation entre l’Orient et l’Occident. Études et travaux sur l’unité chrétienne offerts à Dom Lambert Beauduin. Chevetogne: Éditions de Chevetogne, 1954, pp. 323–349.
 "The Mediaeval Cultural Heritage of the Mid-European Area". Review of Politics 18:4 (1956), pp. 487–507. ("Based on a lecture given ... at Wayne University Detroit, March 17, 1954.")
 "The Byzantine Church and the Immaculate Conception", in The Dogma of the Immaculate Conception, edited by Edward D. O'Connor. Notre Dame, Ind.: University of Notre Dame Press, 1958, pp. 87–112.
 "Die Benediktiner und die Christianisierung Russlands". Benediktinische Monatschrift 35:4 (1959), pp. 292–310.
 "Patriarch Photius: Scholar and Statesman", Classical Folia 13 (1959), pp. 3–18; 14 (1960), pp. 2–22.
 "The Patriarch Photius and Roman Primacy". Chicago Studies (1963), pp. 94–107.
 "The Slavs between East and West". Marquette University Slavic Institute Papers no. 19. Milwaukee, Wis.: Marquette University, Slavic Institute, 1964.
 "Die Bedeutung der Brüder Cyrill und Method für die Slaven- und Kirchengeschichte: Festvortrag", in Prolegomena ad Acta Congressus historiae Slavicae Salisburgensis in memoriam SS. Cyrilli et Methodii anno 1963 celebrati. Wiesbaden: Otto Harrassowitz, 1964, pp. 17–32.
 "The Significance of the Missions of Cyril and Methodius". Slavic Review 23:2 (1964), pp. 195–211.
 "SS. Cyrille et Méthode et la Christianisation des Slaves". Slavic and East-European Studies 8 (1963), pp. 132–152.
 "Two Problems in the History of St. Constantine-Cyril", in Festschrift für Dmitrij Tschizewskij zum 70. Geburtstag. Munich: Wilhelm Fink Verlag, 1966, pp. 181–186.
 "Patriarch Ignatius and Caesar Bardas". Byzantinoslavica 27:1 (1966), pp. 7–22.
 "The Embassies of Constantine-Cyril and Photius to the Arabs", in To Honor Roman Jakobson: Essays on the Occasion of his Seventieth Birthday. The Hague: Mouton, 1967, pp. 569–576.
 "The Byzantine Mission to Moravia", in Czechoslovakia Past and Present, edited by Miloslav Rechcigl. Vol. 2. Essays on the arts and sciences. Mouton, [1968?], pp. 1107–1121.
 "Missions of the Greek and Western Churches in the East during the Middle Ages". Lecture at the 13th International Congress of Historical Sciences, Moscow, 1970.
 "Photius, Nicholas I and Hadrian II", Byzantinoslavica 34:1 (1973), pp. 33–50.

ON FRANCIS DVORNIK

I presupposti storici del primato del vescovo di Roma nell'opera di Frantisek Dvornik: by Antonio Porpora -Roma, Edizioni Orientalia Christiana,2019.

Homage to Francis Dvornik: ed. by V. Vavrinek, Petra Melichar and Martina Cechova -Prague,2018.

Sources
 "Memoirs of Fellows and Corresponding Fellows of the Mediaeval Academy of America", Speculum 51:3 (1976).

References

1893 births
1975 deaths
20th-century Czech historians
Czech Byzantinists
Czechoslovak Roman Catholic priests
Czech expatriates in the United States
People from Kroměříž District
Recipients of the Order of Tomáš Garrigue Masaryk
Slavists
Palacký University Olomouc alumni
Corresponding Fellows of the British Academy
Scholars of Byzantine history
Scholars of Byzantine theology